The Royal Spanish Cycling Federation or RFEC (in Spanish: Real Federación Española de Ciclismo) is the national governing body of cycle racing in Spain. As of 2020, the federation has 3,634 registered clubs and 75,638 federated cyclists.

It covers the disciplines of road racing, track cycling, cyclo-cross, BMX, mountain biking and cycle speedway.

The Federation is a member of the Union Cycliste Internationale and the Union Européenne de Cyclisme. It is based in Madrid.

See also
 List of cycling races in Spain
 List of cycling teams in Spain

References

External links
 Royal Spanish Cycling Federation official website

Spain
 
Cycling
Cycle racing organizations
Sports organizations established in 1896
Organisations based in Spain with royal patronage